Tripomatic Fairytales 2001 is an album by German electronic music duo Jam & Spoon, released in 1993. It features their three International hit singles, "Right in the Night (Fall in Love with Music)", "Find Me (Odyssey to Anyoona)" and "Angel (Ladadi O-Heyo)". The album was re-structured twice to permit the inclusion of "Find Me (Odyssey to Anyoona)" and "Angel (Ladadi O-Heyo)", released after the first pressing of the album.

Track listing
"Heart of Africa" – 6:49
"Odyssey to Anyoona" – 9:59
"Two Spys in the House of Love" – 0:32
"Stella" – 6:19
"Neurotrance Adventure" – 5:42
"Operating Spaceship Earth" – 1:28
"Zen Flash Zen Bones" – 6:10
"Who Opened the Door to Nowhere" – 2:44
"Right in the Night (Fall in Love with Music)" (Single Version) – 6:05
"Muffeled Drums" – 0:40
"Path of Harmony" – 7:02
"Paradise Garage" – 6:30
"Earth Spirit" – 6:28
"Stellas Cry" – 7:25

References

 

1993 albums
Electronic dance music albums
Electronic dance music albums by German artists